Crypsitricha pharotoma is a species of moth in the family Tineidae. It was described by Edward Meyrick in 1888. This species is endemic to New Zealand.

The wingspan is 8–10 mm. The forewings are light brownish-ochreous, more or less suffused with whitish-ochreous, and with a few dark fuscous scales, as well as a rather dark fuscous elongate-triangular blotch extending along the costa from the base to before the middle, reaching about half across the wing, marked with a black spot at the apex and three black spots on the costa. There is a blackish mark in the disc before the middle, connected with this beneath the costa, followed by an obscure ochreous-whitish bar. There is sometimes a blackish mark in the disc beyond the middle. The posterior half of the costa is obscurely dotted with whitish and dark fuscous and some dark fuscous and black scales form obscure spots on the hindmargin. The hindwings are whitish-grey.

References

Moths described in 1888
Tineidae
Moths of New Zealand
Endemic fauna of New Zealand
Taxa named by Edward Meyrick
Endemic moths of New Zealand